Thespesia garckeana  (also known by its synonym Azanza garckeana) is a tree in the family Malvaceae, found throughout the warmer parts of Southern Africa in wooded grasslands, open woodland and thickets. It grows naturally over a range of altitudes from 1,000 to 2,000 m above sea level, from semi-arid areas to areas of higher rainfall. T. garckeana is often found on or near termite mounds in old fields.

Common names: African chewing gum, snot apple, tree hibiscus, mutohwe (Shona), nkole (Sri Lanka), uXakuxaku (isiNdebele) and morojwa (Setswana).

Uses
 The whole fruit except the seeds is chewed like gum, producing a sweet glutinous slime. The fruit is also used as a syrup and soup.
 The sap wood is yellow and the heart wood is a deep brown. It is easily worked but generally only suitable for small building needs, tool handles, oxen yokes, and domestic items such as spoons.
 The leaves of T. garckeana have many uses including green manure and mulch. The leaves also provide an often used fodder.

See also
 List of Southern African indigenous trees

References

 

garckeana
Trees of South Africa
Flora of Zimbabwe
Fruits originating in Africa
Tropical fruit
Flora of Africa